Merinda Park railway station is located on the Cranbourne line in Victoria, Australia. It serves the south-eastern Melbourne suburb of Cranbourne North, and it opened on 24 March 1995.

History

Merinda Park station opened on 24 March 1995, as part of the electrification of the line to Cranbourne. The name of the station comes from an adjacent housing estate that was constructed in the 1980s.

In 1977, flashing light signals were provided at the former Thompsons Road level crossing, which was located nearby in the Down direction of the station. In 1995, boom barriers were provided as part of the electrification project. On 25 June 2018, the level crossing was grade separated, as part of the Level Crossing Removal Project, as well as part of a major upgrade of Thompsons Road.

In December 2019, plans were announced by the Level Crossing Removal Project to completely rebuild the station, as part of the Cranbourne line duplication. A second platform was added, and the main entrance moved to a more central location. On 18 March 2021, part of the new station opened, with the remainder of the station completed by 13 February 2022. The duplication also involved a new timetable for the Cranbourne line, with services operating roughly every 10 minutes during the morning peak-hour.

Platforms and services

Merinda Park has two side platforms. It is serviced by Metro Trains' Cranbourne line services.

Platform 1:
  all stations and limited express services to Flinders Street; all stations shuttle services to Dandenong

Platform 2:
  all stations services to Cranbourne

By late 2025, it is planned that trains on the Cranbourne line will be through-routed with those on the Sunbury line, via the new Metro Tunnel.

Transport links

Cranbourne Transit operates two routes to and from Merinda Park station, under contract to Public Transport Victoria:
 : to The Avenue Village Shopping Centre (Cranbourne North)
 : to Clyde North

References

External links
 
 Melway map at street-directory.com.au

Railway stations in Melbourne
Railway stations in Australia opened in 1995
Railway stations in the City of Casey